Alexander Rotinoff (20 March 1875 – 26 April 1934)  was an architect and engineer of late 19th and early 20th century throughout the Caucasus. He was of Armenian descent.

Together with Gabriel Ter-Mikaelyan he applied to construct the Armenian church of Thadeus and Bartholomew in Baku in 1901.

Great Britain
In early 20th century, Alexander Rotinoff moved to Great Britain with his family and son - Mikhail Aleksander Rotinoff. Mikhail's son George Rotinoff founded Rotinoff Motors Ltd. at Colnbrook near Slough in 1952.

Rotinoff is buried in Brompton Cemetery in London on the outer side of the western columbarium.

References 

Russian architects
1875 births
1934 deaths